Santa Kyriaki was a   cargo ship that was built in 1945 as Empire Crusoe by Ailsa Shipbuilding Co, Troon, Ayrshire, Scotland for the Ministry of War Transport (MoWT). She was sold in 1946 and renamed Greenland and a further sale in 1955 saw her renamed Heminge. In 1956, she was sold to Liberia and renamed Maria Luisa. A sale in 1963 to a Panamanian company saw her renamed Santa Kyriaki. She served until running aground off IJmuiden, Netherlands in 1965  and was scrapped in 1966.

Description
The ship was built in 1945 by Ailsa Shipbuilding Co, Troon, Ayrshire. She was Yard Number 448.

The ship was propelled by a triple expansion steam engine.

History
Empire Crusoe was built for the MoWT, which later became the Ministry of Transport.  In 1946, she was sold to Currie Line Ltd, Leith, Midlothian and was renamed Greenland. In 1955, she was sold to Constants Ltd, Cardiff, Glamorgan and renamed Heminge. She was sold the next year to Socoa Shipping Co Ltd, Monrovia, Liberia, and renamed Maria Luisa. She was operated under the management of Ramon de la Sota, France, remaining under the Liberian flag. In 1963, Maria Luisa was sold to Nereide Compagnia Maritime SA, Panama and renamed Santa Kyriaki.

On 24 November 1965, Santa Kyriaki was in ballast off the coast of the Netherlands when she was caught in a Force 10-11 storm. The Dutch tug Titan offered assistance to Santa Kyriaki, which was refused. At 15:00 CET (14:00 GMT), Santa Kyriaki came ashore south of IJmuiden. Her  17 crew were taken off by a Koninklijke Marine helicopter. After the storm had subsided, Santa Kyriaki became a temporary tourist attraction. On 30 December, the contract for the salvage of the ship was awarded to NV Bureau Wijsmuller under Lloyds Open Form conditions. Over  of sand was excavated to form a basin which enabled Santa Kyriaki to be turned through 60°. She was refloated on 8 March 1966 with assistance from the tugs Titan and Simson, aided by the use of her own engine. Titan towed her into IJmuiden, where she was declared to be a constructive total loss. She was later towed to Amsterdam. Santa Kyriaki arrived under tow on 17 July 1966 at Avilés, Spain for scrapping.

References

External links
Photo of Greenland
Photo of the stranded Santa Kyriaki
Two photos of the stranded Santa Kyriaki
British Pathé newsreel of the stranded ship

1945 ships
Ships built in Scotland
Empire ships
Ministry of War Transport ships
Steamships of the United Kingdom
Merchant ships of the United Kingdom
Steamships of Liberia
Merchant ships of Liberia
Maritime incidents in 1965